Abida vasconica is a species of small air-breathing land snail, a terrestrial pulmonate gastropod mollusc in the family Chondrinidae. This species is endemic to northern Spain.

Geographic distribution
Abida vasconica is limited to the central part of the Cantabrian Mountains, from Asturias and León in the west to Bizkaia and Álava in the east. This land snail is mainly found on northern slopes.

Ecology
The species can be found in soils with limestone substrate, under rocks and leaf litter and within crevices in rock. It can be found on vertical rock surfaces in areas of high humidity.

References

Chondrinidae
Gastropods of Europe
Gastropods described in 1882